Douglas Lynn Farr is an American architect and urban planner. Farr was born in Detroit, Michigan and received his undergraduate degree in architecture from the University of Michigan in Ann Arbor and his master's from Columbia Graduate School of Architecture, Planning and Preservation.

In 1991, Farr founded Farr Associates Architecture and Urban Design, Inc., a sustainable architectural and planning firm in Chicago, Illinois.

Farr is Vice Chair of the board for the Congress for the New Urbanism, a member of the LEED Steering Committee and was the inaugural chair of the LEED for Neighborhood Development committee. He is the founder of the 2030 Communities Campaign that seeks to reduce vehicle miles traveled. In 2007 he authored Sustainable Urbanism: Urban Design With Nature.

Further reading 
Farr, Douglas (2007). Sustainable Urbanism: Urban Design With Nature. Hoboken: Wiley. 
Chicago MagazineRodkin, Dennis. "The Stalwart."Chicago Magazine April 2008: 93. Tribune Company.
Concrete Thinker
Zwaniecki, Andrzej. "Sustainable Urbanism Responds to Market Needs." U.S. Department of State. May 21, 2008.

External links 
Farr Associates

References

New Urbanism
American urban planners
Living people
20th-century American architects
Taubman College of Architecture and Urban Planning alumni
Columbia Graduate School of Architecture, Planning and Preservation alumni
21st-century American architects
Architects from Detroit
Year of birth missing (living people)
University of Michigan alumni